Acridocarpus (from Gr. Akris, a locust and carpos, a fruit, alluding to the winged fruit) is a genus of plant in family Malpighiaceae. They are native to Arabia and tropical and subtropical Africa, with one species in New Caledonia.

Species
There are some 30 species, which include:
 Acridocarpus austrocaledonicus
 Acridocarpus chevalieri
 Acridocarpus monodii Arènes & P.Jaeger ex Birnbaum & J.Florence
 Acridocarpus orientalis (Jebel Hafeet, UAE / Oman)
 Acridocarpus natalitius Adr. & Juss.
 Acridocarpus socotranus Oliv.

References

External links
 

Malpighiaceae
Malpighiaceae genera
Taxonomy articles created by Polbot